Adana ASKİ SK is a sports club in Adana. Its principal branch is the women's basketball, currently performing at the top flight of the Turkish Women’s Basketball Super League (KBSL). The venue of the basketball team is Menderes Sports Hall.

History

The club was founded in Ceyhan in 2000, under the name 'Ceyhan Belediyespor' by the Ceyhan Municipality. The first branch of the club was wrestling, and the year after, the women's basketball team was formed. In its first year, at the 2nd Division of TKBL, Ceyhan Belediyespor was promoted to 1st Division without losing a game. At the top flight of Turkey's basketball, the club performed for 12 straight years, before moving to Adana. Tarsus Belediye were consolidated into Adana ASKİ. In 2014, the club was taken by the Water and Sanitary Management Department of the Adana Metropolitan Municipality and renamed as Adana ASKİ. After the move, the club performed the best season ever (2014–15), playing final at the Turkish Women's Cup and semi-final at the TKBL First Division.

Honors
  Turkish Women's Basketball League
 Semi-finals (1): 2014–15
 Turkish Women's Cup Basketball
  Runner-up (2): 2010–11, 2014–15

Women's basketball 2016–17 season

Depth chart

References

External links
 Official Website 
 Eurobasket.com Page

Women's basketball teams in Turkey
Sport in Adana
Basketball teams established in 2000